Hansenochrus is a genus of hubbardiid short-tailed whipscorpions, first described by Reddell & Cokendolpher in 1995.

Species 
, the World Schizomida Catalog accepts the following seventeen species:

 Hansenochrus acrocaudatus (Rowland & Reddell, 1979) – Trinidad and Tobago
 Hansenochrus centralis (Gertsch, 1941) – Panama
 Hansenochrus dispar (Hansen, 1905) – Martinique
 Hansenochrus drakos (Rowland & Reddell, 1979) – Guyana
 Hansenochrus flavescens (Hansen, 1905) – Venezuela
 Hansenochrus gladiator (Rémy, 1961) – Suriname
 Hansenochrus guyanensis Cokendolpher & Reddell, 2000 – Guyana
 Hansenochrus humbertoi Armas & Víquez, 2010 – Costa Rica
 Hansenochrus mumai (Rowland & Reddell, 1979) – Costa Rica
 Hansenochrus selva Armas, 2009 – Costa Rica
 Hansenochrus simonis (Hansen, 1905) – Venezuela
 Hansenochrus surinamensis (Rémy, 1961) – Suriname
 Hansenochrus tobago (Rowland & Reddell, 1979) – Trinidad and Tobago
 Hansenochrus trinidanus (Rowland & Reddell, 1979) – Trinidad and Tobago
 Hansenochrus urbanii Villarreal & Teruel, 2006 – Venezuela
 Hansenochrus vanderdrifti (Rémy, 1961) – Suriname
 Hansenochrus yolandae (González-Sponga, 1997) – Venezuela

References 

Schizomida genera